Moda is a quarter in Kadıköy district of Istanbul, Turkey.

Moda is located on a peninsula between the center of Kadıköy and the Kurbağalıdere creek on the Anatolian part of Istanbul. The place became an outstanding residential area only after the 1870s, when wealthy non-Muslims settled down there by building their own mansions. It is a multi-cultural place with Armenian, Greek and Anglican church buildings, Georgian art house, theatres, French Lycée Saint-Joseph (1870) Kadıköy Anatolian High School (1955), old curiosity shops, fish and international food restaurants.

Moda is served by the 2003-established Kadıköy-Moda Nostalgia Tram line.

Notable buildings and structures in Moda are:
 Süreyya Opera House, 1927-opened opera house,
 Moda Marine Club (1935),
 Moda Pier, 1917-built, 2022-restored passenger ferry pier.

Historic mansions
 Agah Bey Mansion, 
 Antipa Mansion, 
 Bursalı Riza Bey Mansion, 
 Dowson Mansion, 
 Mahmut Ata Bey Mansion, 
 Cemil Cem Mansion, 
 Fredrichi Mansion, 
 Fürstenberger Mansion, 
 Cemal Kutay Mansion, 
 Lorando Mansion,
 Arif Sarıca Mansion, a 1903-built mansion, residence of concert pianist Ayşegül Sarıca, 
 Şevket Salih Soysal Mansion, 
 Mahmut Muhtar Pasha Mansion,
 Reşit Pasha Mansion, 
 Tubini Mansion
 Whittall Mansion, a 1900 built mansion, which was home to rock musician Barış Manço, and is a historic house museum today,

Gallery

References

Neighbourhoods of Kadıköy